Zhang Dequn (born 10 January 1963) is a Chinese wrestler. He competed in the men's Greco-Roman 62 kg at the 1984 Summer Olympics.

References

External links
 

1963 births
Living people
Chinese male sport wrestlers
Olympic wrestlers of China
Wrestlers at the 1984 Summer Olympics
Place of birth missing (living people)
20th-century Chinese people